Roman Ivanov (born March 19, 1984, in Tolyatti, Russia) is a former Russian speedway rider who was a member of Russia national team.

Honours 

 Team Speedway Championship (Speedway World Cup)
 2001 - 4th place in Preliminary round 2 (2 points) (with Latvia team)
 2004 - 3rd place in Qualifying round 2 (10 points)
 2007 - 6th place - 4th place in Race-Off (4 points)
 Team U-21 World Championship
 2005 - 3rd place in Qualifying Round 3 (5 points)
 Individual European Championship
 2007 - 8th place in Semi-Final A (8 points)
 2008 - 9th place in Semi-Final 3 (8 points)
 European Pairs Championship
 2006  Lendava - 5th place (10 points)
 2008  Natschbach-Loipersbach - The Final will be on 2008-09-20 (6 points in Semi-Final 1)
 2006 European Speedway Club Champions' Cup
 2006 - 2nd place in Semi-Final 1 (10 points) with Tolyatti
 2007  Miskolc - Bronze medal (6 points) with Tolyatti
 2008  Slaný - The Final will be on 2008-09-08 (10 points in Semi-Final)

See also 
 Russia national speedway team

References

External links 
 (ru) Rider's profil on MegaLada.ru

1984 births
Living people
Russian speedway riders
Sportspeople from Tolyatti